Ozomdel may refer to:
Ozomdel-e Jonubi Rural District
Ozomdel-e Shomali Rural District